Emileia is an extinct genus from a well-known class of fossil cephalopods, the ammonites, that lived during the early part of the Bajocian.

Emileiais a large form with fine ribbing that includes may secondaries. It begins as a barrel shaped cadicone, with an eccentric, more or less smooth body chamber.

Emileia is included in the family Otoitidae and superfamily Stephanoceratoidea of the Ammonitina

References

Jurassic ammonites
Ammonites of Europe
Bajocian life
Ammonitida genera
Stephanoceratoidea